Jud Kinberg (July 7, 1925 – November 2, 2016) was an American film producer and screenwriter.

His son is the screenwriter and director Simon Kinberg.

Selected filmography 
The films Kinberg worked on include:

 Producer
 1954: Executive Suite 
 1954: Her Twelve Men
 1955: The Cobweb
 1955: Moonfleet
 1956: Lust for Life
 1965:The Collector
 1968: The Magus
 1973: Story of a Love Story
 Scriptwriter
 1963: Siege of the Saxons 
 1964: East of Sudan
 Television
 1981: The Million Dollar Face
 1988: A Stoning in Fulham County
 1992: In the Best Interest of the Children
 1992: To Catch a Killer

References

External links

1925 births
2016 deaths
Writers from New York City
American producers
Screenwriters from New York (state)